Marie Bagger Rasmussen (born November 1, 1972) is a retired pole vaulter from Denmark, who after her marriage was named as Marie Bagger Bohn. She represented her native country in the women's pole vault event at the 2000 Summer Olympics in Sydney, Australia, finishing in eighth place. She set her personal best there (4.35 metres) on September 9th, 2000.

Competition record

References

Results

1972 births
Living people
Danish female pole vaulters
Athletes (track and field) at the 2000 Summer Olympics
Olympic athletes of Denmark
Place of birth missing (living people)